Borovak pri Podkumu is a settlement east of Podkum in the Municipality of Zagorje ob Savi in central Slovenia. The area is part of the traditional region of Lower Carniola. It is now included with the rest of the municipality in the Central Sava Statistical Region.

Name
Borovak pri Podkumu was attested in written sources as Borabakg in 1444 and Borabakh  1449. The name of the settlement was changed from Borovak to Borovak pri Podkumu in 1955.

Church
The local church (building) in the settlement is dedicated to Saint Ursula and belongs to the Parish of Šentjurij–Podkum. It is a Gothic building that was extended in the 17th century and restyled around 1800.

References

External links
Borovak pri Podkumu on Geopedia

Populated places in the Municipality of Zagorje ob Savi